is a Japanese professional basketball player for the Kawasaki Brave Thunders of the B.League.

He was a member of Japan's national basketball team at the 2016 FIBA Asia Challenge in Tehran, Iran, where he recorded most assists for Japan.

He is a member of Japan's national basketball team at the 2019 FIBA Basketball World Cup qualification (Asia).

Career statistics 

|-
| align="left" |  2011-12
| align="left" | Toshiba
| 36|| 25 || 23.1|| .393|| .374|| .731|| 2.1|| 2.4|| 1.1|| 0|| 1.4|| 7.2
|-
| align="left" |  2012-13
| align="left" | Toshiba
| 42|| 42 || 26.7|| .518|| .477|| .820|| 2.4|| 3.1|| 1.1|| 0.1|| 1.6|| 6.6
|-
| align="left" |  2013-14
| align="left" | Toshiba
| 49|| 44 || 22.7|| .525|| .493|| .581|| 1.7|| 2.5|| 1.0|| 0.1|| 1.4|| 5.1
|-
| align="left" |  2014-15
| align="left" | Toshiba
| 19|| 17 || 22.0|| .467|| .417|| .833|| 1.5|| 2.7|| 0.7|| 0|| 1.0|| 5.0
|-
| align="left" | 2015-16
| align="left" | Toshiba
| 51|| 36 || 21.4|| .476|| .324|| .810|| 1.6|| 2.5|| 1.1|| 0.1|| 1.7|| 4.3
|-
| align="left" |  2016-17 
| align="left" | Kawasaki
| 60 || 60 ||22.6 ||.477 ||.299 ||.671 ||0.8 ||3.3 ||0.9 ||0.2 ||1.3 ||7.5
|-
| align="left" | 2017-18 
| align="left" | Kawasaki
| 56 || 51 || 23.1 ||.471 ||.361 ||.783 ||2.0 ||3.7 || 0.9|| 0.1||1.6 ||8.5
|-
| align="left" | 2018-19 
| align="left" | Kawasaki
| 60 || 52 || 26.8 || .490 || .412 || .809 || 1.8 || 4.6 || 0.8 || 0.1 || 1.3 || 9.0
|-
| align="left" | 2019-20 
| align="left" | Kawasaki
| 27 || 25 || 22.2 || .494 || .326 || .745 || 1.8 || 4.7 || 1.0 || 0.1 || 1.8 || 8.3
|-
| align="left" | 2020-21 
| align="left" | Kawasaki
| 59 || 33 || 20.0 || .454 || .337 || .700 || 1.3 || 4.7 || 0.7 || 0.1 || 1.2 || 5.9
|-
| align="left" | 2021-22 
| align="left" | Kawasaki
| 55 || 14 || 17.8 || .443 || .330 || .757 || 1.2 || 3.8 || 0.7 || 0.1 || 1.2 || 5.4
|-
| align="left" | 2022-23 
| align="left" | Kawasaki
| 28 || 2 || 16.2 || .403 || .361 || .688 || 1.4 || 2.8 || 0.5 || 0.0 || 1.2 || 4.9
|- class="sortbottom"
| style="text-align:center;" colspan="2"|Career
| 542 || 401 || 22.1 || .469 || .371 || .740 || 1.7 || 3.5 || 0.9 || 0.1 || 1.4 || 6.6
|}

References

External links
 Profile at the 2016 FIBA Asia Challenge
 Asia-basket.com Profile

1988 births
Living people
Basketball players from Tokyo
Japanese men's basketball players
Nihon University Red Sharks men's basketball players
Point guards
Kawasaki Brave Thunders players
2019 FIBA Basketball World Cup players